Rangaku (Kyūjitai: /Shinjitai: , literally "Dutch learning", and by extension "Western learning") is a body of knowledge developed by Japan through its contacts with the Dutch enclave of Dejima, which allowed Japan to keep abreast of Western technology and medicine in the period when the country was closed to foreigners from 1641 to 1853 because of the Tokugawa shogunate's policy of national isolation (sakoku).

Through Rangaku, some people in Japan learned many aspects of the scientific and technological revolution occurring in Europe at that time, helping the country build up the beginnings of a theoretical and technological scientific base, which helps to explain Japan's success in its radical and speedy modernization following the forced American opening of the country to foreign trade in 1854.

History

The Dutch traders at Dejima in Nagasaki were the only Europeans tolerated in Japan from 1639 until 1853 (the Dutch had a trading post in Hirado from 1609 till 1641 before they had to move to Dejima), and their movements were carefully watched and strictly controlled, being limited initially to one yearly trip to give their homage to the shōgun in Edo. They became instrumental, however, in transmitting to Japan some knowledge of the industrial and scientific revolution that was occurring in Europe: In 1720 the ban on Dutch books was lifted and the Japanese purchased and translated scientific books from the Dutch, obtained from them Western curiosities and manufactures (such as clocks, medical instruments, celestial and terrestrial globes, maps and plant seeds) and received demonstrations of Western innovations, including of electrical phenomena, as well as the flight of a hot air balloon in the early 19th century. While other European countries faced ideological and political battles associated with the Protestant Reformation, the Netherlands were a free state, attracting leading thinkers such as René Descartes.

Altogether, thousands of such books were published, printed, and circulated. Japan had one of the largest urban populations in the world, with more than one million inhabitants in Edo, and many other large cities such as Osaka and Kyoto, offering a large, literate market to such novelties. In the large cities some shops, open to the general public, specialized in foreign curiosities.

Beginnings (1640–1720)

The first phase of Rangaku was quite limited and highly controlled. After the relocation of the Dutch trading post to Dejima, trade as well as the exchange of information and the activities of the remaining Westerners (dubbed "Red-Heads" (kōmōjin)) were restricted considerably. Western books were prohibited, with the exemption of books on nautical and medical matters. Initially, a small group of hereditary Japanese–Dutch translators labored in Nagasaki to smooth communication with the foreigners and transmit bits of Western novelties.

The Dutch were requested to give updates of world events and to supply novelties to the shōgun every year on their trips to Edo. Finally, the Dutch factories in Nagasaki, in addition to their official trade work in silk and deer hides, were allowed to engage in some level of "private trade". A small, lucrative market for Western curiosities thus developed, focused on the Nagasaki area. With the establishment of a permanent post for a surgeon at the Dutch trading post Dejima, high-ranking Japanese officials started to ask for treatment in cases when local doctors were of no help. One of the most important surgeons was Caspar Schamberger, who induced a continuing interest in medical books, instruments, pharmaceuticals, treatment methods etc. During the second half of the 17th century high-ranking officials ordered telescopes, clocks, oil paintings, microscopes, spectacles, maps, globes, birds, dogs, donkeys, and other rarities for their personal entertainment and for scientific studies.

Liberalization of Western knowledge (1720–)

Although most Western books were forbidden from 1640, rules were relaxed under shōgun Tokugawa Yoshimune in 1720, which started an influx of Dutch books and their translations into Japanese. One example is the 1787 publication of Morishima Chūryō’s , recording much knowledge received from the Dutch. The book details a vast array of topics: it includes objects such as microscopes and hot air balloons; discusses Western hospitals and the state of knowledge of illness and disease; outlines techniques for painting and printing with copper plates; it describes the makeup of static electricity generators and large ships; and it relates updated geographical knowledge.

Between 1804 and 1829, schools opened throughout the country by the Shogunate (Bakufu) as well as terakoya (temple schools) helped spread the new ideas further.

By that time, Dutch emissaries and scientists were allowed much more free access to Japanese society. The German physician Philipp Franz von Siebold, attached to the Dutch delegation, established exchanges with Japanese students. He invited Japanese scientists to show them the marvels of Western science, learning, in return, much about the Japanese and their customs. In 1824, von Siebold began a medical school in the outskirts of Nagasaki. Soon this  grew into a meeting place for about fifty students from all over the country. While receiving a thorough medical education they helped with the naturalistic studies of von Siebold.

Expansion and politicization (1839–)

The Rangaku movement became increasingly involved in Japan's political debate over foreign isolation, arguing that the imitating of Western culture would strengthen rather than harm Japan. The Rangaku increasingly disseminated contemporary Western innovations.

In 1839, scholars of Western studies (called 蘭学者 "rangaku-sha") briefly suffered repression by the Edo shogunate in the  incident, due to their opposition to the introduction of the death penalty against foreigners (other than Dutch) coming ashore, recently enacted by the Bakufu. The incident was provoked by actions such as the Morrison Incident, in which an unarmed American merchant ship was fired upon under the Edict to Repel Foreign Ships. The edict was eventually repealed in 1842.

Rangaku ultimately became obsolete when Japan opened up during the last decades of the Tokugawa regime (1853–67). Students were sent abroad, and foreign employees (o-yatoi gaikokujin) came to Japan to teach and advise in large numbers, leading to an unprecedented and rapid modernization of the country.

It is often argued that Rangaku kept Japan from being completely uninformed about the critical phase of Western scientific advancement during the 18th and 19th century, allowing Japan to build up the beginnings of a theoretical and technological scientific base. This openness could partly explain Japan's success in its radical and speedy modernization following the opening of the country to foreign trade in 1854.

Types

Medical sciences

From around 1720, books on medical sciences were obtained from the Dutch, and then analyzed and translated into Japanese. Great debates occurred between the proponents of traditional Chinese medicine and those of the new Western learning, leading to waves of experiments and dissections. The latter was a compilation made by several Japanese scholars, led by Sugita Genpaku, mostly based on the Dutch-language Ontleedkundige Tafelen of 1734, itself a translation of Anatomische Tabellen (1732) by the German author Johann Adam Kulmus.

In 1804, Hanaoka Seishū performed the world's first general anaesthesia during surgery for breast cancer (mastectomy). The surgery involved combining Chinese herbal medicine and Western surgery techniques, 40 years before the better-known Western innovations of Long, Wells and Morton, with the introduction of diethyl ether (1846) and chloroform (1847) as general anaesthetics.

In 1838, the physician and scholar Ogata Kōan established the Rangaku school named Tekijuku. Famous alumni of the Tekijuku include Fukuzawa Yukichi and Ōtori Keisuke, who would become key players in Japan's modernization. He was the author of 1849's , which was the first book on Western pathology to be published in Japan.

Physical sciences
Some of the first scholars of Rangaku were involved with the assimilation of 17th century theories in the physical sciences. This is the case of Shizuki Tadao (:ja:志筑忠雄) an eighth-generation descendant of the Shizuki house of Nagasaki Dutch translators, who after having completed for the first time a systematic analysis of Dutch grammar, went on to translate the Dutch edition of Introductio ad Veram Physicam of the British author John Keil on the theories of Newton (Japanese title: , 1798). A second Rangaku scholar, Hoashi Banri (:ja:帆足万里), published a manual of physical sciences in 1810 –  – based on a combination of thirteen Dutch books, after learning Dutch from just one Dutch-Japanese dictionary.

Electrical sciences

Electrical experiments were widely popular from around 1770. Following the invention of the Leyden jar in 1745, similar electrostatic generators were obtained for the first time in Japan from the Dutch around 1770 by Hiraga Gennai. Static electricity was produced by the friction of a glass tube with a gold-plated stick, creating electrical effects. The jars were reproduced and adapted by the Japanese, who called it . As in Europe, these generators were used as curiosities, such as making sparks fly from the head of a subject or for supposed pseudoscientific medical advantages. In Sayings of the Dutch, the elekiteru is described as a machine that allows one to take sparks out of the human body, to treat sick parts. Elekiterus were sold widely to the public in curiosity shops. Many electric machines derived from the elekiteru were then invented, particularly by Sakuma Shōzan.

Japan's first electricity manual,  by Hashimoto Soukichi (:ja:橋本宗吉), published in 1811, describes electrical phenomena, such as experiments with electric generators, conductivity through the human body, and the 1750 experiments of Benjamin Franklin with lightning.

Chemistry

In 1840, Udagawa Yōan published his , a compilation of scientific books in Dutch, which describes a wide range of scientific knowledge from the West. Most of the Dutch original material appears to be derived from William Henry’s 1799 Elements of Experimental Chemistry. In particular, the book contains a detailed description of the electric battery invented by Volta forty years earlier in 1800. The battery itself was constructed by Udagawa in 1831 and used in experiments, including medical ones, based on a belief that electricity could help cure illnesses.

Udagawa's work reports for the first time in details the findings and theories of Lavoisier in Japan.

Optical sciences

Telescopes

Japan's first telescope was offered by the English captain John Saris to Tokugawa Ieyasu in 1614, with the assistance of William Adams, during Saris's mission to open trade between England and Japan. This followed the invention of the telescope by Dutchman Hans Lippershey in 1608 by a mere six years. Refracting telescopes were widely used by the populace during the Edo period, both for pleasure and for the observation of the stars.

After 1640, the Dutch continued to inform the Japanese about the evolution of telescope technology. Until 1676 more than 150 telescopes were brought to Nagasaki. In 1831, after having spent several months in Edo where he could get accustomed with Dutch wares, Kunitomo Ikkansai (a former gun manufacturer) built Japan's first reflecting telescope of the Gregorian type. Kunitomo's telescope had a magnification of 60, and allowed him to make very detailed studies of sun spots and lunar topography. Four of his telescopes remain to this day.

Microscopes
Microscopes were invented in the Netherlands during the 17th century, but it is unclear when exactly they reached Japan. Clear descriptions of microscopes are made in the 1720  and in the 1787 book Saying of the Dutch. Although Europeans mainly used microscopes to observe small cellular organisms, the Japanese mainly used them for entomological purposes, creating detailed descriptions of insects.

Magic lanterns

Magic lanterns, first described in the West by Athanasius Kircher in 1671, became very popular attractions in multiple forms in 18th-century Japan.

The mechanism of a magic lantern, called  was described using technical drawings in the book titled  in 1779.

Mechanical sciences

Automata

Karakuri are mechanized puppets or automata from Japan from the 18th century to 19th century. The word means "device" and carries the connotations of mechanical devices as well as deceptive ones. Japan adapted and transformed the Western automata, which were fascinating the likes of Descartes, giving him the incentive for his mechanist theories of organisms, and Frederick the Great, who loved playing with automatons and miniature wargames.

Many were developed, mostly for entertainment purposes, ranging from tea-serving to arrow-shooting mechanisms. These ingenious mechanical toys were to become prototypes for the engines of the industrial revolution. They were powered by spring mechanisms similar to those of clocks.

Clocks

Mechanical clocks were introduced into Japan by Jesuit missionaries or Dutch merchants in the sixteenth century. These clocks were of the lantern clock design, typically made of brass or iron, and used the relatively primitive verge and foliot escapement. These led to the development of an original Japanese clock, called Wadokei.

Neither the pendulum nor the balance spring were in use among European clocks of the period, and as such they were not included among the technologies available to the Japanese clockmakers at the start of the isolationist period in Japanese history, which began in 1641. As the length of an hour changed during winter, Japanese clock makers had to combine two clockworks in one clock. While drawing from European technology they managed to develop more sophisticated clocks, leading to spectacular developments such as the Universal Myriad year clock designed in 1850 by the inventor Tanaka Hisashige, the founder of what would become the Toshiba corporation.

Pumps

Air pump mechanisms became popular in Europe from around 1660 following the experiments of Boyle. In Japan, the first description of a vacuum pump appear in Aochi Rinsō (:ja:青地林宗)’s 1825 , and slightly later pressure pumps and void pumps appear in Udagawa Shinsai (宇田川榛斎(玄真))’s 1834 . These mechanisms were used to demonstrate the necessity of air for animal life and combustion, typically by putting a lamp or a small dog in a vacuum, and were used to make calculations of pressure and air density.

Many practical applications were found as well, such as in the manufacture of air guns by Kunitomo Ikkansai, after he repaired and analyzed the mechanism of some Dutch air guns which had been offered to the shōgun in Edo. A vast industry of  developed, also derived by Kunitomo from the mechanism of air guns, in which oil was continuously supplied through a compressed air mechanism. Kunitomo developed agricultural applications of these technologies, such as a giant pump powered by an ox, to lift irrigation water.

Aerial knowledge and experiments

The first flight of a hot air balloon by the brothers Montgolfier in France in 1783, was reported less than four years later by the Dutch in Dejima, and published in the 1787 Sayings of the Dutch.

In 1805, almost twenty years later, the Swiss Johann Caspar Horner and the Prussian Georg Heinrich von Langsdorff, two scientists of the Kruzenshtern mission that also brought the Russian ambassador Nikolai Rezanov to Japan, made a hot air balloon out of Japanese paper (washi) and made a demonstration of the new technology in front of about 30 Japanese delegates.

Hot air balloons would mainly remain curiosities, becoming the object of experiments and popular depictions, until the development of military usages during the early Meiji period.

Steam engines

Knowledge of the steam engine started to spread in Japan during the first half of the 19th century, although the first recorded attempts at manufacturing one date to the efforts of Tanaka Hisashige in 1853, following the demonstration of a steam engine by the Russian embassy of Yevfimiy Putyatin after his arrival in Nagasaki on August 12, 1853.

The Rangaku scholar Kawamoto Kōmin completed a book named  in 1845, which was finally published in 1854 as the need to spread Western knowledge became even more obvious with Commodore Perry’s opening of Japan and the subsequent increased contact with industrial Western nations. The book contains detailed descriptions of steam engines and steamships. Kawamoto had apparently postponed the book's publication due to the Bakufu's prohibition against the building of large ships.

Geography

Modern geographical knowledge of the world was transmitted to Japan during the 17th century through Chinese prints of Matteo Ricci's maps as well as globes brought to Edo by chiefs of the VOC trading post Dejima. This knowledge was regularly updated through information received from the Dutch, so that Japan had an understanding of the geographical world roughly equivalent to that of contemporary Western countries. With this knowledge, Shibukawa Shunkai made the first Japanese globe in 1690.

Throughout the 18th and 19th centuries, considerable efforts were made at surveying and mapping the country, usually with Western techniques and tools. The most famous maps using modern surveying techniques were made by Inō Tadataka between 1800 and 1818 and used as definitive maps of Japan for nearly a century. They do not significantly differ in accuracy with modern ones, just like contemporary maps of European lands.

Biology

The description of the natural world made considerable progress through Rangaku; this was influenced by the Encyclopedists and promoted by von Siebold (a German doctor in the service of the Dutch at Dejima). Itō Keisuke created books describing animal species of the Japanese islands, with drawings of a near-photographic quality.

Entomology was extremely popular, and details about insects, often obtained through the use of microscopes (see above), were widely publicized.

Plants were requested by the Japanese and delivered from the 1640s on, including flowers such as precious tulips and useful items such as the cabbage and the tomato.

Other publications 
 Automatons: , 1730.
 Mathematics: .
 Optics: .
 Glass-making: .
 Military: , by Takano Chōei concerning the tactics of the Prussian Army, 1850.

Aftermath

Commodore Perry

When Commodore Perry obtained the signature of treaties at the Convention of Kanagawa in 1854, he brought technological gifts to the Japanese representatives. Among them was a small telegraph and a small steam train complete with tracks. These were promptly studied by the Japanese as well.

Essentially considering the arrival of Western ships as a threat and a factor for destabilization, the Bakufu ordered several of its fiefs to build warships along Western designs. These ships, such as the [[Japanese warship Hōō Maru|Hōō-Maru]], the Shōhei-Maru, and the Asahi-Maru, were designed and built, mainly based on Dutch books and plans. Some were built within a mere year or two of Perry's visit. Similarly, steam engines were immediately studied. Tanaka Hisashige, who had made the Myriad year clock, created Japan's first steam engine, based on Dutch drawings and the observation of a Russian steam ship in Nagasaki in 1853.

In 1858, the Dutch officer Kattendijke commented:

Last phase of "Dutch" learning

Following Commodore Perry's visit, the Netherlands continued to have a key role in transmitting Western know-how to Japan for some time. The Bakufu relied heavily on Dutch expertise to learn about modern Western shipping methods. Thus, the Nagasaki Naval Training Center was established in 1855 right at the entrance of the Dutch trading post of Dejima, allowing for maximum interaction with Dutch naval knowledge. From 1855 to 1859, education was directed by Dutch naval officers, before the transfer of the school to Tsukiji in Tokyo, where English educators became prominent.

The center was equipped with Japan's first steam warship, the Kankō Maru, given by the government of the Netherlands the same year, which may be one of the last great contributions of the Dutch to Japanese modernization, before Japan opened itself to multiple foreign influences. The future Admiral Enomoto Takeaki was one of the students of the Training Center. He was also sent to the Netherlands for five years (1862–1867), with several other students, to develop his knowledge of naval warfare, before coming back to become the admiral of the shōguns fleet.

Enduring influence of Rangaku
Scholars of Rangaku continued to play a key role in the modernization of Japan. Scholars such as Fukuzawa Yukichi, Ōtori Keisuke, Yoshida Shōin, Katsu Kaishū, and Sakamoto Ryōma built on the knowledge acquired during Japan's isolation and then progressively shifted the main language of learning from Dutch to English.

As these Rangaku scholars usually took a pro-Western stance, which was in line with the policy of the Shogunate (Bakufu) but against anti-foreign imperialistic movements, several were assassinated, such as Sakuma Shōzan in 1864 and Sakamoto Ryōma in 1867.

Notable scholars

 Arai Hakuseki (1657–1725), author of Sairan Igen and Seiyō Kibun
 Aoki Kon'yō (1698–1769)
 Maeno Ryōtaku (1723–1803)
 Yoshio Kōgyū (1724–1800)
 Hiraga Gennai (1729–79) proponent of the "Elekiter"
 Gotō Gonzan
 Kagawa Shūan
 Asada Gōryū (1734–99)
 Motoki Ryōei (1735–94), author of 
 Shiba Kōkan (1747–1818), painter.
 Hanaoka Seishū (1760–1835), first physician who performed surgery using general anaesthesia.
 Takahashi Yoshitoki (1764–1804)
 Motoki Shōei (1767–1822)
 Takahashi Kageyasu (1785–1829)
 Matsuoka Joan
 Itō Keisuke (1803–1901), author of 
 Takano Chōei (1804–50), physician, dissident, co-translator of a book on the tactics of the Prussian Army, 1850.
 Ōshima Takatō (1810–71), engineer — established the first western style blast furnace and made the first Western-style cannon in Japan.
 Sakuma Shōzan (1811–64)
 Hashimoto Sōkichi
 Hazama Shigetomi
 Takeda Ayasaburō (1827–80), architect of the fortress of Goryōkaku
 Ōkuma Shigenobu (1838–1922)
 Yoshio Kōgyū (1724–1800), translator, collector and scholar

See also
 Dutch missions to Edo
 Glossary of Japanese words of Dutch origin
 Japan–Netherlands relations
 Meiji Restoration
 Nakatsu
 Keio University
 Uki-e

Notes

References
 Seeing and Enjoying Technology of Edo, 2006,  (Japanese)
 The Thought-Space of Edo Timon Screech, 1998,  (Japanese)
 Glimpses of medicine in early Japanese-German intercourse''. In: International Medical Society of Japan (ed.): The Dawn of Modern Japanese Medicine and Pharmaceuticals -The 150th Anniversary Edition of Japan-German Exchange. Tokyo: International Medical Society of Japan (IMSJ), 2011, pp. 72–94.

External links

 .
 .
 .
 .

 
Edo period
Foreign relations of the Dutch Republic
History of science and technology in Japan
History of the Dutch East India Company
Japanese historical terms
Japan–Netherlands relations